Sy.Med Development, Inc. (also referred to as SyMed) develops and licenses software that manages credentialing-related tasks for healthcare providers and payers. Sy.Med's software, OneApp Pro, uses a data management system that automates form completion for the credentialing process.

Company history
Sy.Med was established in 1995 and serves 760 clients across North America. These organizations represent 230,000 healthcare providers (physicians, allied health professionals, and physician extenders) in various healthcare, dental, chiropractic, and revenue cycle management (RCM) organizations .

Software history
 In 2003, Sy.Med released OneApp Pro 3.5 with ExportTool that integrates with Microsoft Office for data export capabilities.
 In 2004, Sy.Med released OneApp Pro 4.0 with AuditTrail that tracks changes made to the software database.
 In 2004, Sy.Med released OneApp Pro 4.1 with Privileges that facilitates management of providers' core privileges.
 In 2009, Sy.Med released OneApp Pro 5.2 with OneApp Facility and 20 facility credentialing screens, reports, and tools.
 In 2009, Sy.Med released OneApp Pro 5.3 with NotiPhy that automates email notifications to providers based on expiration alerts.
 In 2009, Sy.Med released OneApp Pro 5.3 with OneApp Web that gives software users a browser-based version of OneApp Pro utilizing Microsoft® Silverlight® technology.
 In 2009, Sy.Med released OneApp Pro 5.3 with NoPen that allows healthcare providers to enroll online using browser-based version of OneApp Pro.
 In 2010, Sy.Med released OneApp Pro 6.0 with Contract Management that tracks the details of providers' payer contracts.
 In 2010, Sy.Med released OneApp Pro 6.1 with CAQH Integration that allows healthcare organizations to import data into OneApp Pro from CAQH.
 In 2010, Sy.Med released OneApp Pro 6.1 with Adobe Acrobat integration that allows automated form completion to PDF format.
 In 2011, Sy.Med released OneApp Pro 6.2 with API module that allows C# programmers to make low level calls to the NoPen and OneApp Web database.
 In 2011, Sy.Med released OneApp Pro 6.2 with Document Manager for advanced file management capabilities.
 In 2011, Sy.Med released OneApp Cloud that allows credentialing software to be hosted in the cloud on third party hardware.
 In 2012, Sy.Med released OneApp Pro 6.3 with DevExpress Reports that included advanced chart and graph reporting capabilities.
 In 2012, Sy.Med released OneApp Pro 6.3 with OneApp Web including alerts, reports, search and form completion.

Awards
 In 2002, Sy.Med was named a "Music City Future 50 company" by the Nashville Area Chamber of Commerce.
 In 2003, Sy.Med was named a "Music City Future 50 company" by the Nashville Area Chamber of Commerce.
 In 2003, Sy.Med was named "Best in Business" in the 1 to 25 Employees category by Nashville Business Journal.
 In 2004, Sy.Med was named "Best in Business" in the 1 to 25 Employees category by Nashville Business Journal.
 In 2004, Sy.Med was named a Microsoft Gold Certified Partner Independent Software Vendor.
 In 2007, Sy.Med was named one of "The Fastest Growing Private Companies in America" by Inc. 5000.
 In 2008, Sy.Med was named one of "The Fastest Growing Private Companies in America" by Inc. 5000.
 In 2009, Sy.Med was named one of "The Fastest Growing Private Companies in America" by Inc. 5000.
 In 2009, Sy.Med's CEO, Jim Aylward, was named a Health Care Hero by Nashville Business Journal.
 In 2011, Sy.Med was ranked as the #5 Small Business in Nashville and the #46 Small Business in the South by Business Leader's "Top 300 Small Businesses".

References

Companies established in 1995
Health software
Software companies based in Tennessee
Defunct software companies of the United States